Rein Oja (born 26 February 1956) is an Estonian actor, film director and theatre leader.

Rein Oja was born in Tallinn. He is the older brother of actor Tõnu Oja. In 1978 he graduated from Tallinn State Conservatory. In 1978-1997 he worked at Noorsooteater/Tallinn City Theatre. Since 1998 he is a freelancer. Since 2006 he is the head of Estonian Drama Theatre.

Filmography

 1989: Äratus (feature film; role: II Vallamees)
 1997: All My Lenins (feature film; role: Bolshevik / NKVD Agent)
 2003: Baltic Storm (feature film; role: Captain Arvo Kallas) 
 2006: Meeletu (feature film; role: Rommi)
 2006: Vana daami visiit (feature film; role: Journalist) 
 2007: Georg (feature film; role: Richard) 
 2010: ENSV (television series: Olev Schellenberg) 		
 2016: Polaarpoiss (feature film; role: Hanna's father)
 2018: Mihkel (feature film; role: Sacristan)
 2019: Lotte ja kadunud lohed (animated film; role: James (voice))
 2020: O2 (feature film; role: Colonel Saar)
 2020: Rain (feature film; role: Kalju)

References

Living people
1956 births
Estonian male stage actors
Estonian male film actors
Estonian male television actors
Estonian male radio actors
Estonian male voice actors
Estonian theatre directors
20th-century Estonian male actors
21st-century Estonian male actors
Recipients of the Order of the White Star, 4th Class
Estonian Academy of Music and Theatre alumni
Male actors from Tallinn